"Debra" is a song by the American musician Beck. It was released on his album Midnite Vultures.

Background
Beck had originally attempted to record and release "Debra" with the Dust Brothers for Odelay, but he thought that it was too tongue-in-cheek. It was debuted mainstream in 1996, and, as Beck noted, "it became the centerpiece of the whole set. It was the song that people would react to more than the songs that they'd heard on the radio. So we kept playing it and playing it". The song finally made it on to Midnite Vultures in 1999.

Composition
The song's lyrics are about meeting a girl named Jenny who works at the retail store JCPenney and wanting to "get with" her and her sister, Debra. The lyrics include a reference to the Los Angeles-based restaurant chain Zankou Chicken, as well as a mention of car manufacturer Hyundai and a reference to another song on Midnite Vultures, "Sexx Laws."

Debra contains samples of two songs; "Win" by David Bowie and "My Love for You" by Ramsey Lewis.

In popular culture
Many music critics consider "Debra" to be one of Beck's greatest songs, with Ty Kulik claiming that "Midnite Vultures is a tremendous record, and "Debra" is the highlight of the whole record." The song was used in the 2017 Edgar Wright film Baby Driver and as inspiration for music in Flight of the Conchords.

Cover versions
The song was covered by German industrial artist Kompressor. Kompressor's version is called "Kompressor Want to Get with You".

Additionally, the song has been covered in live shows by the US band I Dont Know How But They Found Me. This version was released digitally on 26 February 2021.

The jam band Umphrey’s McGee also covers Debra in live shows, most notably at Sweetwater 420 Fest in Atlanta.

References 

1999 songs
Beck songs
Songs written by Beck
Song recordings produced by Dust Brothers
Songs written by John King (record producer)
Songs written by Michael Simpson (producer)